This is a list of monuments in Rasuwa District, Nepal as officially recognized by and available through the website of the Department of Archaeology, Nepal. Rasuwa is a district of Bagmati Province and is located in central northern parts of Nepal.

List of monuments

|}

See also 
 List of monuments in Bagmati Province
 List of monuments in Nepal

References

External links

Rasuwa